The Newark Falcons were an American soccer club based in Newark, New Jersey that was a member of the American Soccer League. The club was previously known as Elizabeth Falcons, based in Elizabeth, New Jersey, and for a season as Falcons-Warsaw. After the 1958–59 season, the club became simply Falcons S.C. and became known as Falcons-Warsaw before the 1962–63 season. After the 1963–64 season, the team became the Newark. The team disbanded during the 1966–67 season.

Year-by-year Elizabeth

Year-by-year Newark

See also
Sports in Newark, New Jersey
George Brown (soccer)
Elizabeth S.C.

References

Defunct soccer clubs in New Jersey
American Soccer League (1933–1983) teams
Sports in Newark, New Jersey
Polish-American organizations
Polish association football clubs outside Poland